Thessaliotis was one of the four districts into which ancient Thessaly was divided. The others were Pelasgiotis, Histiaeotis, and Phthiotis. Thessaliotis corresponded to the central plain of Thessaly and the upper course of the river Peneius, so called from its having been first occupied by the Thessalian conquerors from Epirus. Its major towns were: Pharsalus (the most important), Peirasia, Phyllus, Metropolis, Cierium, Euhydrium, and Thetidium.

References

 
Historical regions in Greece
Geography of ancient Thessaly